James Robert Mann (April 27, 1920 – December 20, 2010) was a World War II soldier, lawyer and Democratic United States Representative from South Carolina.

Early life and career
Mann was born in Greenville, to Alfred Clio Mann (1889–1956) and Nina Mae (Griffin) Mann. He graduated from Greenville High School in 1937. He then went to Charleston to receive his bachelor's degree at The Citadel in 1941. With the outbreak of World War II, Mann enlisted in the U.S. Army and served on active duty until 1946, when he became a reservist with the rank of colonel. After the war, Mann enrolled at the University of South Carolina School of Law where he was editor of the South Carolina Law Review and graduated magna cum laude in 1947 as a member of the Euphradian Society.  He was admitted to the state bar the same year and established a private practice in Greenville.

Political career
In 1948, Mann was elected to the South Carolina House of Representatives and he served for two terms until Governor James F. Byrnes appointed him as the circuit solicitor for the 13th judicial circuit of South Carolina to succeed Robert T. Ashmore in 1953. He was re-elected twice to that post and served until 1962. Afterwards, he became the secretary for the Greenville County Planning Commission and a trustee of the Greenville Hospital System. In 1968, Mann won election to the U.S. House of Representatives as a Democrat to represent the 4th congressional district. While in the House, Mann was a member of the Judiciary Committee that voted to recommend the impeachment of President Nixon, ultimately drafting portions of Articles I and II of the final report. His other committee assignments included the Select Committee on Crime, the Committee for the District of Columbia, and the Select Committee on Narcotics Abuse and Control. Mann did not seek re-election in 1978 and left Congress to resume his law practice in Greenville.

Accomplishments
Mann was a recipient of the Order of the Palmetto, South Carolina's highest civilian award.

Notes

References

 James R. Mann Papers at South Carolina Political Collections at the University of South Carolina

1920 births
2010 deaths
United States Army personnel of World War II
Military personnel from South Carolina
University of South Carolina School of Law alumni
South Carolina lawyers
Democratic Party members of the South Carolina House of Representatives
Politicians from Greenville, South Carolina
South Carolina state solicitors
The Citadel, The Military College of South Carolina alumni
Democratic Party members of the United States House of Representatives from South Carolina
20th-century American politicians
United States Army colonels
United States Army reservists
20th-century American lawyers
Greenville Senior High School (Greenville, South Carolina) alumni